Events from the year 1880 in the United States

Incumbents

Federal Government 
 President: Rutherford B. Hayes (R-Ohio)
 Vice President: William A. Wheeler (R-New York)
 Chief Justice: Morrison Waite (Ohio)
 Speaker of the House of Representatives: Samuel J. Randall (D-Pennsylvania)
 Congress: 46th

Events

 February – The journal Science is first published, with financial backing from Thomas Edison.
 February 2 – The first electric streetlight is installed in Wabash, Indiana.
 March 31 – Wabash, Indiana becomes the first electrically lighted city in the world.
 May 11 – Mussel Slough Tragedy: A land dispute between the Southern Pacific Railroad and settlers in Hanford, California, turns deadly when a gun battle breaks out, leaving 7 dead.
 May 13 – In Menlo Park, New Jersey, Thomas Edison performs the first test of his electric railway.
 May 30 – League of American Wheelmen is founded in Newport, Rhode Island.
 June 1 – United States Census is 50,155,783.
 September 30; Amateur astronomer Henry Draper takes the first ever photograph of the Orion Nebula.
 October 6 – The University of Southern California opens its doors to 53 students and 10 faculty.
 October 15 – The first blizzard mentioned in Laura Ingalls Wilder's The Long Winter sweeps over the prairie in Dakota Territory.
 November 2 – U.S. presidential election, 1880: James Garfield defeats Winfield S. Hancock.
 November 4 – The first cash register is patented by James and John Ritty of Dayton, Ohio.
 November 22 – Vaudeville actress Lillian Russell makes her debut at Tony Pastor's Theatre in New York City.

Undated
 The Department of Scientific Temperance Instruction of the Women's Christian Temperance Union is established.
 Charles Wesley Emerson founds the Boston Conservatory of Elocution, Oratory, and Dramatic Art, predecessor of Emerson College.
 More than 100,000 Chinese men and 3,000 Chinese women are living in the western United States.

Ongoing
 Gilded Age (1869–c. 1896)

Sport 
September 15 – The Chicago White Stockings clinch their Second National League pennant with a 5–2 win over the Cincinnati Reds.

Births

January–June
 January 6 – Tom Mix, Western film actor (d. 1940)
 January 14 – Joseph Warren Beach, poet, novelist, critic and literary scholar (d. 1957)
 January 20 – Walter W. Bacon, accountant and politician, 60th Governor of Delaware (d. 1962)
 January 26 
 Sylvia Ashton, silent film actress (d. 1940)
 Douglas MacArthur, general (d. 1964)
 January 28 – Dorothy Donnelly, actress and lyricist (d. 1928)
 January 29 – W. C. Fields, born William Claude Dukenfield, comic actor (d. 1946)
 February – Maud E. Craig Sampson Williams, African American suffragist (d. 1958)
 February 12 – John L. Lewis, labor union leader (d. 1969)
 February 14 – Frederick J. Horne, admiral (d. 1959)
 February 16 – Frank Burke, baseball player (d. 1946)
 February 19 – Arthur Shepherd, composer (d. 1958)
 February 2 – Angelina Weld Grimke, African American lesbian journalist and poet (d. 1958)
 March 4 – Channing Pollock, playwright and critic (d. 1946) 
 March 10 – Broncho Billy Anderson, Western film actor (d. 1971)
 March 11 – Harry H. Laughlin, eugenicist (d. 1943)
 March 28 – Louis Wolheim, character actor (d. 1931)
 April 18 – Sam Crawford, baseball player (d. 1968)
 May 6 – William Joseph Simmons, founder of the second Ku Klux Klan in 1915 (d. 1945)
 June 4 – Clara Blandick, actress (d. 1962)
 June 9 – William S. Pye, admiral (d. 1959)
 June 11 – Jeannette Pickering Rankin, first woman elected to U.S. Congress (d. 1973)
 June 17 – Carl Van Vechten, writer and photographer (d. 1964)
 June 21 – Arnold Gesell, developmental psychologist (d. 1961)
 June 24 – Oswald Veblen, mathematician (d. 1960)
 June 26 – Mitchell Lewis, actor (d. 1956)
 June 27 – Helen Keller, campaigner for the deaf and blind (d. 1968)

July–December
 July 10 – Greye La Spina, born Fanny Greye Bragg, fiction writer (d. 1969)
 July 12 – Tod Browning, motion picture director, horror film pioneer (d. 1962)
 July 26 – Jean Clemens, youngest child of Mark Twain (d. 1909)
 July 30 – Robert R. McCormick, newspaper publisher (d. 1955)
 August 2 – Arthur Dove, abstract painter (d. 1946)
 August 10
 Robert L. Thornton, businessman, philanthropist and mayor of Dallas, Texas (d. 1964)
 Catherine Evans Whitener, textile manufacturer (d. 1964)
 August 12 – Christy Mathewson, baseball player (d. 1925)
 August 22 – George Herriman, cartoonist (d. 1944)
 September 14 – Archie Hahn, sprinter (d. 1955)
 September 12 – H. L. Mencken, journalist (d. 1956)
 September 24 – Sarah Knauss, supercentenarian, all-time longest lived American (d. 1999)
 October 4 – Damon Runyon, writer (d. 1946)
 November 1 – Grantland Rice, sportswriter (d. 1954)
 November 10 – Jacob Epstein, sculptor (d. 1959 in the United Kingdom)
 November 12 – Harold Rainsford Stark, admiral (d. 1972)
 December 4 – Garfield Wood, motorboat racer (d. 1971)
 December 24 – Johnny Gruelle, cartoonist and children's book author (d. 1938)
 December 31 – George Marshall, United States Secretary of State, recipient of the Nobel Peace Prize in 1953 (d. 1959)

Undated
 Eliza Grant, African American midwife
 Aunt Molly Jackson, folk singer and union activist (d. 1960)

Deaths
 January 1 – Morris Ketchum, financier (b. 1796)
 January 8 – "Emperor Norton", eccentric (b. c.1818 in the United Kingdom)
 January 12 – Ellen Lewis Herndon Arthur, wife of future President Chester A. Arthur (b. 1837)
 January 19 – James Westcott, U.S. Senator from Florida from 1845 to 1849, died in Montréal, Québec, Canada (b. 1802)
 February 14 – Samuel G. Arnold, U.S. Senator from Rhode Island from 1862 to 1863 (b. 1821)
 February 17 – James Lenox, bibliophile (b. 1800)
 May 4 – Edward Clark, Confederate Governor of Texas (b. 1815)
 May 8 – Jones Very, Transcendentalist essayist, poet, clergyman and mystic (born 1813)
 June 12 – Albert G. Brown, U.S. Senator from Mississippi from 1854 to 1861 (b. 1813)
 June 13 – James A. Bayard Jr., U.S. Senator from Delaware from 1851 to 1864 (b. 1799)
 June 17 – James B. Howell, U.S. Senator from Iowa from 1870 to 1871 (b. 1816)
 June 28 – Texas Jack Omohundro, frontier scout, actor and cowboy (b. 1846)
 July 7 – Lydia Maria Child, novelist and abolitionist (b. 1802)
 July 21 – Hiram Walden, politician (b. 1800)
 August 9 – William Bigler, U.S. Senator from Pennsylvania from 1856 to 1861 (born 1814)
 August 16 – Herschel Vespasian Johnson, United States Senator from Georgia from 1863 until 1865. (born 1812)
 August 19 – James Seddon, 4th Confederate States Secretary of War (born 1815)
 August 24 – Ouray, Ute leader (b. c. 1833)
 September 19 – Lafayette S. Foster, U.S. Senator from Connecticut from 1855 to 1867 (born 1806)
 October – Victorio, Chiricahua Apache chief (b. c.1825)
 November 3 - Solon Robinson, founder of Crown Point, Indiana (born 1803)
 November 9 – Edwin Drake, first American to successfully drill for oil (b. 1819)
 November 11 – Lucretia Mott, abolitionist and women's rights activist (born 1793)
 December 20 – Gaspar Tochman, lawyer and Confederate colonel (b. 1797 in Poland)
 December 30 – Epes Sargent, editor, poet and playwright (b. 1813)

See also
Timeline of United States history (1860–1899)

References

External links
 

 
1880s in the United States
United States
United States
Years of the 19th century in the United States